Calliotropis pheidole is a species of sea snail, a marine gastropod mollusk in the family Eucyclidae.

Description
The shell grows to a height of 2.7 mm.

Distribution
This species occurs in the Pacific Ocean off Fiji and Tonga.

References

 Vilvens C. (2007) New records and new species of Calliotropis from Indo-Pacific. Novapex 8 (Hors Série 5): 1–72

External links
 

pheidole
Gastropods described in 2007